Redin Kingsley is an Indian actor and comedian who predominantly works in the Tamil film industry. He is best known for his loud style of speech in films.

Career 
Redin was initially working as an event organizer for government exhibitions in Chennai and Bangalore before he was entering into the film industry. His debut film, a 2016 project directed by Nelson Dilipkumar, was shelved. Later in 2018, he appeared in Nayanthara's Kolamaavu Kokila, again directed by Nelson.

After appearing in minor roles in a few films, Kingsley rose to fame following roles in Netrikann in 2021 and Doctor . He has also starred in Rajinikanth's Annaatthe (2021) and in Vijay's Beast (2022), both produced by Sun Pictures. He also starred in Vadivelu's comedy film Naai Sekar Returns.

Filmography

Upcoming films

References

External links 
 

Tamil comedians
Tamil male actors
Indian male film actors
Male actors in Tamil cinema
Living people
Year of birth missing (living people)